Jérémie Beyou is a French professional Offshore sailor born on 27 June 1976 in Landivisiau (Finistère). He is a member of C N Lorient Sailing Club.

He won the Solitaire du Figaro three times in 2005, 2011 and 2014 and was crowned French champion in solo offshore racing in 2002 and 2005. He also won the Volvo Ocean Race onboard DongFeg and competed in four Vendee Globe.

Career highlights

References

External links
 Official Personal Website 
 Official Campaign Website 
 Official Instgram 
 Official Facebook

1976 births
Living people
French male sailors (sport)
Sportspeople from Saint-Malo
Volvo 65 class sailors
Volvo Ocean Race sailors
IMOCA 60 class sailors
French Vendee Globe sailors
2008 Vendee Globe sailors
2012 Vendee Globe sailors
2016 Vendee Globe sailors
2020 Vendee Globe sailors
Vendée Globe finishers